Charles Massey Enwright (October 6, 1887 – January 19, 1917) was a shortstop in Major League Baseball.

External links

1887 births
1917 deaths
Baseball players from Sacramento, California
Major League Baseball shortstops
St. Louis Cardinals players
Saint Mary's Gaels baseball players
Sacramento (minor league baseball) players
Sacramento Cordovas players
Sacramento Senators players